This is a list of the General Top 20 songs of 2009 in Mexico according to Monitor Latino. Monitor Latino also issued separate year-end charts for Regional Mexican, Pop and Anglo songs.

See also
List of number-one songs of 2009 (Mexico)
List of number-one albums of 2009 (Mexico)

References

Number-one songs
Mexico Top 20
Mexican record charts